The School of Social Work is a school at the University of Illinois at Urbana–Champaign which exclusively focuses on social work education. The school was originally a graduate school, but began an undergraduate program in Fall 2010.

On July 28, 2017, Steve Anderson was named as the new dean of the school. He succeeded Wynne Korr on September 15. Korr had served since 2002.

Facilities
The School of Social Work houses one building, located on Nevada Street in Urbana. Until 2009, the building used to be housed on Oregon Street. The current location is three blocks east of the Main Quadrangle, and a block east of Busey–Evans Residence Halls.

Ranking
As of 2016, the master's program has been ranked #16 nationally by U.S. News & World Report.

Concentrations
Any student pursuing their MSW can choose from five different concentrations.
 Leadership and Social Change
 Children, Youth, and Family Services
 Health Care
 Mental Health
 School Social Work.

Leadership and Social Change
Leadership and Social Change prepares students for a social work career focused on advocacy. The curriculum also includes international social work advocacy.

Children, Youth, and Family Services
Children, Youth, and Family services prepares students for a social work career focused on serving disadvantaged children, youth, and families.

Health Care
Health Care prepares students for a social work career focused on the medical field. Within this concentration, the social worker acts as a supportive network for their hospitalized client in need.

Mental Health
Mental Health social workers focus on the internal mental problems that ail their clients.

School Social Work
School Social Work prepares students to become Social Workers in schools.

Requirements

Bachelor of Social Work
Students pursuing their bachelor's degree must complete the following:
 50 hours of volunteer or paid work in a social service agency.
 Maintain a 2.5 GPA or higher.
 Show evidence of strong communication and interpersonal skills.
 Show personal attributes that are suitable for the social work profession.
 Complete the application for the professional program entry.

Master of Social Work
Students pursuing their master's degree must complete the required coursework and a semester long internship.

PhD of Social Work
Students pursuing a doctorate degree must complete coursework organized around five curricular components: seminars in social welfare policy, research methodologies and statistics, an interdisciplinary area of study, a qualifying exam, and a dissertation.

References

External links
 School of Social Work

Buildings and structures of the University of Illinois Urbana-Champaign
Schools of social work in the United States
Social Work
1944 establishments in Illinois